L'Embellie is the fifth studio album recorded by French singer Calogero, and was released on 20 April 2009.

Background
The album was preceded by lead single "C'est dit," written by Jean-Jacques Goldman.

For this album, Calogero asked many French singers and songwriters to compose the lyrics, including Dominique A, Dick Annegarn, Kent, Grand Corps Malade, Pierre Lapointe, Marc Lavoine, Pierre Pelù and Jean-Jacques Goldman. Calogero himself has written for the first time in his solo career a song text for "Je me suis trompé". Alana Filippi, who wrote "En apesanteur" seven years earlier, and Gioacchino, the singer's brother, also participated in the composing of the album.

The album went straight to number one on the French and Belgian (Wallonia) Albums Charts.

Track listing

Charts and sales

Weekly charts

Year-end charts

Certifications

References

2009 albums
Calogero (singer) albums